Events in the year 1590 in Norway.

Incumbents
Monarch: Christian IV

Events
7 April – Anne Pedersdotter was burned alive at the stake in the city of Bergen. Her case is regarded as the starting point of the witch trials in Norway.

Arts and literature

Births
Peter Paulson Paus, provost (died 1653)

Probable
Magdalena Andersdotter, shipowner (died c.a 1650)

Deaths
7 April – Anne Pedersdotter, alleged witch.

See also

References